Shiney Ahuja (born 15 May 1973) is an Indian actor in Bollywood films. He won the Filmfare Best Male Debut Award for Hazaaron Khwaishein Aisi in 2006 and then followed with several hit films like Gangster, Woh Lamhe, Life in a Metro, Bhool Bhulaiyaa, and Welcome Back.

Early life 
Ahuja was born on 15 May 1973 into a Punjabi family in New Delhi, India. Ahuja's father was in the Indian Army. He studied at St. Xavier's School, Ranchi, and Army Public School, Dhaula Kuan, and attended the Hansraj College of Delhi University. Later, he joined the theatre group "TAG" where he met Barry John. Shortly thereafter, he joined John's acting school in Delhi.

Career 
After completing college, Shiney secured his first commercial ad for Pepsi. This instantly brought him into consideration by the top ad agencies. Flooded with offers, Ahuja worked in over 40 ad films in that year, including Cadburys and Citibank. He also featured in the music video 'Pyar ho Gaya' for the British-Asian band "Stereo Nation."

Sudhir Mishra, who was auditioning for a film by Pritish Nandy Communications, Hazaaron Khwaishein Aisi, saw Shiney in the Pepsi commercial and called him to audition for Kay Kay's character – Sidharth Tyabji. Upon Shiney's request, Mishra also auditioned him for the role of Vikram Malhotra. Shiney was selected from over 200 aspirants for the role of Vikram Malhotra and made his acting debut in the film. The film went on to win critical acclaim, and was screened at as many as 12 film festivals over 6 months. These included film festivals at Turkey, Estonia, River to River (Florence), Berlin, Edinburgh, Washington, Dallas, India (Goa), Bite The Mango festival (Bradford, UK), the Commonwealth festival (Manchester), and the Pacific Rim festival (California). The film was released commercially in 2005 with minimal publicity but a national footprint across India. Ahuja received several best actor (debut) awards given for the year including Filmfare, Zee Cine, and Stardust.

Thereafter, he played the lead role in Mahesh Bhatt's Gangster, a popular commercial movie genre and Woh Lamhe opposite Kangana Ranaut. Other films followed including Life in a Metro, Bhool Bhulaiyaa.  Two of his films, Ek Accident with co-star Soha Ali Khan and Har Pal with Preity Zinta are yet to be released.

In 2015, Shiney was cast in Anees Bazmee's Welcome Back co-starring John Abraham, Shruti Hassan, Anil Kapoor, Nana Patekar, Naseeruddin Shah, Dimple Kapadia and Paresh Rawal.

Family
Ahuja is married to Anupam, and they have a daughter Arshiya.

Legal history 
In June 2009, Ahuja was arrested on charges of raping, detaining, and threatening his 19-year-old domestic servant. He was booked under Section  376 (rape), and Section 506 (threat to kill) of the Indian Penal Code.
During the trial, his maid (the victim) recanted on her testimony and told the Court that she was never raped. However, the judge believed that the maid falsely testified under pressure and, in 2011, Ahuja was sentenced to seven years of prison.

This case was the inspiration for the writing of the legal drama film Section 375. The film was written by Manish Gupta, Ahuja's friend who had interacted with the parties of the case during the time of the arrest.

Filmography

Awards

References

External links 
 
 

Living people
Indian male film actors
Male actors in Hindi cinema
People from Delhi
Delhi University alumni
Indian prisoners and detainees
Punjabi people
1973 births
Screen Awards winners
Filmfare Awards winners
Zee Cine Awards winners
International Indian Film Academy Awards winners